Shire of Tambo may refer to:

 Shire of Tambo (Queensland), a former local government area in the state of Queensland, Australia
 Shire of Tambo (Victoria), a former local government area in the state of Victoria, Australia